Rožupe Parish is one of the administrative territories of Līvāni Municipality in the Latgale region of Latvia. It is bordered by Līvāni town, along with Jersika, Sutri, Rudzāti and Turki parishes in its own municipality; Rožkalni and Upmala Parishes in Vārkava Municipality, and, in the Preiļi Municipality, Sauna Parish.

References

Towns and villages in Latvia
Līvāni Municipality
Latgale